Vanikoro is a genus of very small sea snails, marine gastropod mollusks in the family Vanikoridae.

Distribution
This species occurs in the Indian Ocean off Mauritius.

Species
Species within the genus Vanikoro include:
  † Vanikoro accelerans (Marwick, 1928)
 Vanikoro aperta (Carpenter, 1864)
 Vanikoro cancellata (Lamarck, 1822)
 Vanikoro clathrata (Récluz, 1845)
 Vanikoro cumingiana (Récluz, 1844)
 Vanikoro cuvieriana (Récluz, 1845)
 Vanikoro dupliangulata (Laws, 1940) †
 Vanikoro fenestrata (A. Adams, 1863)
 Vanikoro foveolata Souverbie & Montrouzier, 1866
 Vanikoro gaimardi A. Adams, 1854
 Vanikoro galapagana Hertlein & Strong, 1951
 Vanikoro granulosa Récluz, 1845
 Vanikoro gueriniana (Récluz, 1844)
 Vanikoro helicoidea (Le Guillou, 1842)
 Vanikoro kilburni Drivas, J. & M. Jay, 1989 		
 Vanikoro ligata (Récluz, 1843)
 Vanikoro mauritii (Récluz, 1845)
 Vanikoro natalensis E. A. Smith, 1908
 Vanikoro orbignyana (Récluz, 1844)
 Vanikoro oxychone Mörch, 1877
 Vanikoro plicata (Récluz, 1844)
 Vanikoro quoyiana A. Adams, 1854
 Vanikoro satondae Bandel & Kowalke, 1997
 Vanikoro sigaretiformis (Potiez & Michaud, 1838)
 Vanikoro striatus (d’Orbigny, 1842)
 Vanikoro sulcatus (d’Orbigny, 1842)
 Vanikoro tricarinata (Récluz, 1843)
 Vanikoro wallacei Iredale, 1912 
Species brought into synonymy 
 Vanikoro aenigmatica Turton, 1932: synonym of Macromphalus incertus (Turton, 1932)
 Vanikoro blainvilliana (Récluz, 1845): synonym of Vanikoro ligata (Récluz, 1844)
 Vanikoro deshayesiana ([Récluz, 1844): synonym of Vanikoro ligata (Récluz, 1844)
 Vanikoro distans (Récluz, 1845): synonym of Vanikoro gueriniana (Récluz, 1844)
 Vanikoro deshayesiana (Récluz, 1844) : synonym of Vanikoro ligata (Récluz, 1844)
 Vanikoro gracilis Brazier, 1894: synonym of Macromphalus gracilis (Brazier, 1894)
 Vanikoro japonica Pilsbry, 1895: synonym of Vanikoro fenestrata (A. Adams, 1863)
 Vanikoro recluziana A. Adams & Angas, 1864: synonym of Vanikoro sigaretiformis (Potiez & Michaud, 1838)
Taxon inquirendum
 Vanikoro semiplicata Pease, 1861

References

 Vaught, K.C. (1989). A classification of the living Mollusca. American Malacologists: Melbourne, FL (USA). . XII, 195 pp.
 Richmond, M. (Ed.) (1997). A guide to the seashores of Eastern Africa and the Western Indian Ocean islands. Sida/Department for Research Cooperation, SAREC: Stockholm, Sweden. . 448 pp

External links

Vanikoridae